Palin is one of the 60 assembly constituencies of  Arunachal Pradesh a north east state of India. It is part of Arunachal East Lok Sabha constituency.

Members of Legislative Assembly
 1978: Sutem Tasung, People's Party of Arunachal
 1980: Talo Kadu, People's Party of Arunachal
 1990: Dugi Tajik, Janata Dal
 1995: Takam Sanjoy, Janata Dal
 1999: Takam Sanjoy, Indian National Congress
 2004: Balo Raja, Bharatiya Janata Party
 2009: Takam Pario, People's Party of Arunachal
 2014: Takam Pario, Indian National Congress

Election results

2019

See also

 Palin
 Kra Daadi district
 List of constituencies of Arunachal Pradesh Legislative Assembly

References

Assembly constituencies of Arunachal Pradesh
Kra Daadi district